Ketan Mulmuley is a professor in the Department of Computer Science at the University of Chicago, and a sometime visiting professor at IIT Bombay. He specializes in theoretical computer science, especially computational complexity theory, and in recent years has been working on "geometric complexity theory", an approach to the P versus NP problem through the techniques of algebraic geometry, with Milind Sohoni of IIT Bombay. He is also known for his result with Umesh Vazirani and Vijay Vazirani that showed that "Matching is as easy as matrix inversion", in a paper that introduced the isolation lemma.

He earned his PhD in computer science from Carnegie Mellon University in 1985 under Dana Scott, winning the 1986 ACM Doctoral Dissertation Award for his thesis Full Abstraction and Semantic Equivalence. He also won a Miller fellowship at the University of California, Berkeley for 1985–1987, and a Guggenheim Foundation Fellowship for the year 1999–2000.

Books

References

External links
 Faculty page
 List of recent publications
 

Living people
Theoretical computer scientists
Year of birth missing (living people)